William Wolf may refer to:

 William P. Wolf (1833–1896), politician, lawyer and judge from Iowa
 William Wolf (Kansas politician), member of the Kansas House of Representatives
 William Wolf (critic) (1925–2020), American film and theater critic

See also
William Wolfe (disambiguation)
William Wolff (disambiguation)